George Henry Bradbury (June 25, 1859 – September 6, 1925) was a Canadian politician and manufacturer.

Bradbury was the son of William Murray Bradbury and Matilda Morrow, immigrants from Ireland, and was educated in Ottawa. He came to Manitoba in 1881, worked there as a general contractor and later became managing director for the Northwest Lumber Company. He helped establish the Manitoba Brick Company in 1906.

He was elected to the House of Commons of Canada in the 1908 election as a Member of the Conservative Party to represent the riding of Selkirk. He was re-elected to the House of Commons in the 1911 general election. Bradbury was Chairman of the Select Special Committee on Pollution of Navigable Waters during the 12th Parliament. He was appointed to the Senate by Prime Minister Borden on December 17, 1917 and served as the Chairperson of the Special Committee on Cancellation of Leases to Certain Coal Areas in the Province of Alberta.

Bradbury joined Boulton's Scouts in 1885 and fought during the North-West Rebellion, then served as lieutenant colonel in 1915 for the 108th Battalion, Canadian Expeditionary Force where he served for one year.

Bradbury died in office in Ottawa at the age of 66.

References 

1859 births
1925 deaths
Canadian senators from Manitoba
Conservative Party of Canada (1867–1942) MPs
Members of the House of Commons of Canada from Manitoba
Politicians from Hamilton, Ontario
Canadian Expeditionary Force officers